Vallanattu Chettiar are a community who have been classified in the state of Tamil Nadu as an Other Backward Class under India's system of positive discrimination. They live in a small village of Vallanadu, near to Thiruvarankulam in Pudukkottai district. And later, they have migrated to various villages to establish their business.

Thiruvarankulam Temple is the main temple for Vallanattu Chettiar.This Thiruvarankulam temple has existed more than 1000 years. "Udayathu kaatha" Udayappa chettiar formulated the arrangement in this temple, and that is followed till today by Vallanattu Chettiar.

Vallanattu Chettiar is having 12 village division and this village division are segregate as 3 Cheemai (Sectors) as below:
 Mel Mugham   (Melacheemai)
 Nadu Mugam  (Naducheemai)
 Keezh Mugam (Keelacheemai)

Publication related to this chettiars are
 "Vallanattu Chettiar samuga varalaaru (Social History of Vallanattu Chettiar)
 "Vallanattu Chettiar thirumana muraigal" (Marriage process of Vallanattu Chettiar)

Traditional Look & Differences from other Chettiar 

Vallanattu Chettiar have a derived way of look at olden days, as for men and women with big pendent rings on ears, the weight of that which enlarges the lobes of the ears. They celebrate Thiruvathirai, by making  Sweet Adai  (A type of Dosa) in different manner from others, a notified Kolam in their Pooja Room  wall for prayers. Who are married and having wife will lit a lamp (Agal Vilakku) on Thai Pongal celebration by building a sacred small temple as a traditional customs.

See also
Nagarathar
Thiruvathira

References

Social groups of Tamil Nadu
Other Backward Classes